Peter Donald Thompson (22 January 1922 – 1 March 1997) was a rugby union player who represented Australia.

Thompson, a wing, was born in Brisbane, Queensland in March 1926 and claimed 1 international rugby cap for Australia.

He died in March 1997 at the age of 75.

References

1922 births
1997 deaths
Australia international rugby union players
Australian rugby union players
Rugby union players from Brisbane
Rugby union wings